Frantic may refer to:

 Frantic (film), a 1988 film directed by Roman Polanski and starring Harrison Ford
 Frantic (video game), a VIC-20 video game
 Frantic Films, a Canadian Visual Effects company
 "Frantic" (song), a song by Metallica
 Frantic (album), an album by British singer Bryan Ferry
 Operation Frantic, World War II shuttle bombing missions
 Frantic Factory, the third level in Donkey Kong 64
 Frantic Magazine, a monthly humour and parody magazine, published in the UK by Marvel UK from 1979 to 1980

See also
 Frenzy (disambiguation)